The 1928–29 Torquay United F.C. season was Torquay United's second season in the Football League and their second consecutive season in Third Division South.  The season runs from 1 July 1928 to 30 June 1929.

Overview
Having finished bottom of the table for the 1927–28 season in only their first year in the Football League, Torquay United needed to apply for re-election in order to remain in the Third Division South.  Fortunately, for the Magpies, the League members voted in their favour and manager Percy Mackrill set about rebuilding the team in an attempt to make a more competitive showing in their second League campaign.  Mackrill made wholesale changes which meant an entirely new first eleven took to the field at Plainmoor on the first day of the season.  Despite losing their opening game 4–3 to Queens Park Rangers, it wasn't long before Torquay began producing a much more attacking style of football, demonstrated by high scoring victories over Brighton & Hove Albion and Merthyr Town.

Perhaps the most impressive of all the new signings was the former Morton centre forward  Bill Henderson who scored 10 goals in 15 games before his season was ended by injury in the home defeat to Coventry City in November.  Also coming up with the goals were Cyril Hemingway and Bill Gardner, with Hemingway ending the season as top scorer with 12 in all competitions.  Two other strong additions to the team were ex-England goalkeeper Harold Gough and full-back Jack Fowler who would become a crucial part of the Torquay defence for several seasons to come.  Mackrill also managed to discover some local talent in the form of Babbacombe born Sid Cann.  The promising young defender was only 16 when he made his League debut against Crystal Palace in September and made an impressive 17 appearances in his first season at United.

Despite some encouraging performances at the start season (including a 5–1 demolition of Gillingham in the FA Cup), Torquay's form took a serious dip in the New Year.  February and March saw the Magpies lose 9 out of their 10 League games and only a late rally towards the end of the season steered the club away from the need for re-election for a second consecutive year.  Although an 18th-place finish represented some kind of progress for United, with Percy Mackrill leaving the club before the end of the season, another fresh start would be required for Torquay's third year in the Football League.

League statistics

Third Division South

Results summary

Results by round

Match of the season
FULHAM 2–1 TORQUAY UNITEDThird Division SouthCraven Cottage, 25 December 1928 

With an attendance of 20,327, this Christmas Day meeting at Craven Cottage was the largest crowd that a Torquay United team had yet to play in front of.  This was Fulham's first season in Third Division South after having been in the Second Division since 1907 and this would have been viewed as one of toughest fixtures of the season by the Magpies, who had been beaten 3–0 away to Southend just three days previously.  However, Torquay did not disgrace themselves in front of the huge crowd and came away from the Cottage with a fairly respectable 2–1 defeat, United's goal coming from the Welsh inside forward Alwyn Thomas.

Playing in the heart of defence that day in front of ex-England goalkeeper Harold Gough was Willie Brown (who had earlier in the season lost his place to teenage sensation Sid Cann) and the so-called 'Rock of Gibraltar' Jack Fowler, who played in all but four matches for Torquay during the season.  Reliable marksman Cyril Hemingway did not make the scoresheet that day, while goalscorer Alwyn Thomas was playing only his third game of the season after coming in for Dan Kelly. Bill Gardner, meanwhile, had only recently returned to the side due to Bill Henderson's unfortunate injury in November.

The two teams met again at Plainmoor the following day for the Boxing Day fixture (with Jim Carrick replacing Arthur Smeaton at left half).  Jim Mackey scored Torquay's goal in a game which ended in a 1–1 draw.

Results

Third Division South

FA Cup

Club statistics

First team appearances

Source:

Top scorers

Source:

Transfers

In

Out

Source:

References

External links

Torquay United F.C.
Torquay United F.C. seasons